A 10 cent coin is a coinage value in many systems using decimal currencies.

Examples include 
 10 cent euro coin
 Australian ten-cent coin
 Dime (Canadian coin)
 Dime (United States coin)
 Dubbeltje, Dutch
 Hong Kong ten-cent coin

See also 
 Cent (currency)
 Ten cents (disambiguation)